Those Lazy-Hazy-Crazy Days of Summer is a 1963 album by Nat King Cole, arranged by Ralph Carmichael. The album reached #14 on Billboard's LP chart.

Track listing
 "Those Lazy-Hazy-Crazy Days of Summer" (Hans Carste, Charles Tobias) – 2:25
 "Get Out and Get Under the Moon" (William Jerome, Larry Shay, Tobias) – 2:09 	 
 "There is a Tavern in the Town" (Nat King Cole, Traditional) – 1:36 	 
 "On a Bicycle Built for Two" (Cole, Steve Gillette) – 1:46 	 
 "That Sunday, That Summer" (Joe Sherman, George David Weiss) – 3:10 	 
 "On the Sidewalks of New York" (Edith Bergdahl, Cole) – 2:17 	 
 "Our Old Home Town" (Haven Gillespie, Shay) – 1:40 	 
 "After the Ball" (Charles K. Harris) – 2:02 	 
 "You Tell Me Your Dream" (Cole) – 2:18 	 
 "That's What They Meant (By the Good Old Summertime)" (Al Frisch, Tobias) – 2:35 	 
 "Don't Forget" (Sherman, Weiss) – 2:00	 
 "In the Good Old Summer Time" (Cole, George "Honey Boy" Evans, Ren Shields) – 1:30 	 
 "Those Lazy-Hazy-Crazy Days of Summer (Reprise)" – 1:22

Personnel

Performance
 Nat King Cole – vocal
 Ralph Carmichael – arranger, conductor, 
Choral group

SESSION 1: APRIL 11, 1963
 PIANO: Jimmy Rowles
 GUITAR: Laurindo Almeida, Bobby Gibbons, Al Hendrickson
 BASS: Joe Comfort
 DRUMS: Frank Carlson
 PERCUSSION: Larry Bunker
 STRINGS: Alex Borisoff, Emil Briano, Arthur Brown, Harold Dicterow, Jesse Ehrlich, Cecil Figelski, Elliott Fisher, Hyman Gold, Allan Harshman, Lou Klass, Sarah Kreindler, William Kurasch, Alfred Lustgarten, Emmanuel Moss, Alexander Murray, Gareth Nuttycombe, Lou Raderman, Isadore Roman, Nathan Ross, William Vandenburg

SESSION 2: MAY 15, 1963
PIANO: Milton Raskin
GUITAR: Bobby Gibbons, Al Hendrickson
BASS: Joe Comfort
DRUMS: Frank Carlson
PERCUSSION: Larry Bunker
STRINGS: Victor Arno, Arnold Belnick, Emil Briano, Jimmy Getzoff, Nathan Ross, Sid Sharp (concertmaster), Paul Shure, Gerald Vinci
TUBA: Tommy Johnson
SPECIAL GUEST PERFORMER: Alvino Rey

SESSION 3: MAY 16, 1963
PIANO: Milton Raskin
GUITAR: Bobby Gibbons, Al Hendrickson
BASS: Joe Comfort
DRUMS: Irv Cottler
PERCUSSION: Larry Bunker
STRINGS: Victor Arno, Israel Baker, Harold Dicterow, Elliott Fisher, David Frisina, Jimmy Getzoff, Paul Shure, Gerald Vinci
TUBA: Tommy Johnson
SPECIAL GUEST PERFORMER: Alvino Rey

References

1963 albums
Nat King Cole albums
Capitol Records albums
Albums arranged by Ralph Carmichael
Albums conducted by Ralph Carmichael

Albums recorded at Capitol Studios